Ram Lakshman is a 1981 Indian Tamil-language film directed by R. Thyagarajan. The film stars Kamal Haasan and Sripriya. It was released on 28 February 1981, and remade in Telugu as Rama Lakshmanulu in the same year.

Plot 

Ram and his pet elephant Laxman have grown up together and are very emotionally attached to one another. They share such a strong bond that Ram refuses to marry his sweetheart Meena when her father refuses to sanction their marriage unless Ram leaves Laxman. Meanwhile, in a very cunningly planned plot, an employee of Meena's father kills him and implicates Ram and Laxman for the murder. How the two friends stand by each other in the hour of need and how they prove themselves innocent forms the rest of the plot.

Cast 
Kamal Haasan as Ram
Sripriya as Meena
M. N. Nambiar as Chandrasekar Inspector of police
Pandari Bai as Meenakshi (guest appearance)
Asokan as Paranthaman, Meena's Father
Raveendran as Raja
Sivachandran as Kumar
Suruli Rajan
Thengai Srinivasan
Major Sundarrajan
V.Gopalakrishnan

Soundtrack 
The soundtrack was composed by Ilaiyaraaja and the lyrics were written by Vaali and Vairamuthu. The song "Nandhaan Ungappanda" was selected to be played at the opening ceremony of the London 2012 Olympics.

References

External links 
 

1980s Tamil-language films
1981 films
Films about elephants
Films directed by R. Thyagarajan (director)
Films scored by Ilaiyaraaja
Tamil films remade in other languages